Parson is an unincorporated community on the east shore of the Columbia River, in the Columbia Valley region of southeastern British Columbia.

Name origin
E. Thomas Johnson (Johnston alternate spelling) operated a hotel in a tent 1884–1886, before returning to farming and prospecting. During the westward advance of the Canadian Pacific Railway transcontinental line at this time, alcohol was considered a disruptive influence in the construction camps. Consequently, a  alcohol-free zone was instituted on both sides of the right-of-way. Men sleeping off the effects of intoxication at the horse ranch were characterized as pigs (hogs). Consequently, the former name of Johnson's Landing changed to Johnson's Hog Ranch and then to Hog Ranch. The prohibition lifted when the CP line opened to traffic in 1886.

The ranch had also been a rendezvous point for liquor smugglers. Attempts to extradite the murderer who had fled to the US were unsuccessful, but the perpetrator died in a train accident in 1890.

In 1897, Henry George Parson purchased the ranch.

The selection of the train station name in 1912, and the post office in 1916, established the locality as Parson, but as late as 1921, the census still defined the place as Hog Ranch.

Waterway and roads
Early and later transportation was similar to Spillimacheen. In 1884, the government called tenders for a ferry across the Columbia at Johnston's Landing, which commenced operations at that time. North–south riverboats and pack trains stopped at the place. By late fall, ice shut down river traffic until early spring. During 1890, wagon road construction reached Hog Ranch from the south. During the following spring, work began on closing the  gap. In 1893, the wagon road between the two locations was completed, and a deficient section south to Spillimacheen upgraded. Both Carbonate and Hog Ranch were regular riverboat stops.

In 1897, the Skullys managed the hotel at the stopping place for H.G. Parson. In 1899, the respective mileposts from Golden were Carbonate (16), Hog Ranch (23), and Spillimachene (41).

The Parson ferry was subsidized 1920–1929, when a bridge replaced it.

Early community
In 1897, Thomas Alton built a sawmill at the locality, which he sold to Cranbrook Sawmills in 1943.

In 1916, Miss E.R. Sparling was the inaugural teacher at the school.

Elizabeth Hawkins was the inaugural postmaster 1916–1916, followed by James Hawkins 1917–1921. By 1918, dairy farmer R.H. Soles ran a general store, but by 1919, the Hawkins ran the Parson Trading Co general store. In 1921, Andrew Allan Gilmour took over the store/post office, followed by Leslie G. Alton in 1924, who remained until 1950.

Sawmills operating in 1959 were Cranbrook Sawmills, A.D. Hough, O'Bray Bros, and John L. Soles.

Railway
The Kootenay Central Railway (KCR) was a Canadian Pacific Railway (CP) subsidiary. Subsequent railway development mirrored Spillimacheen.

When forestry was dominant, a loading yard was established at Parson, where logs for the Canal Flats sawmill were loaded onto a fleet of Crestbrook Forest Industry flat cars for delivery to the Canal Flats mill. In the 1990s, highway trucking led to the closure of this loading facility.

Later community
The Columbia Valley Elementary School permanently closed in 2002.

The community hall (1939), which had fallen into disrepair and disuse, was rehabilitated in the late 2010s for community events.

The Parson Community Recreation Park facilitates tennis, baseball, beach volleyball, and basketball in summer and skating and sledding in winter.

Twig and Berry Trading Co operates the general store/post office/liquor outlet/gas bar.

Gallery

Wapta

The post office operated 1904–1910. The school existed by 1906 but closed about 1921.

McMurdo (Carbonate)
McMurdo delineated the east shore of the river and Carbonate both shores. Carbonate minerals were found in the area. McMurdo, derived from McMurdo Creek, which acknowledged the original discoverer of minerals in the district. The station, initially called Mallett then Mons, was a shipping point for ore. In 1925, a new station building was erected.

In the 1880s, 70 to 80 pack horses left the west bank at Carbonate Landing twice a month for the mine sites to the southwest. Although the cross river ferry is not mentioned until the early 1890s, a basic service must have existed for years. The 1894 floods destroyed a bridge across a back channel of the Columbia near the landing.

In the late 1890s, Chas. Cartwright was the proprietor of McMurdo House.

The significant ore shipments from this location had become a trickle by 1911. That year, CP cleared and subdivided the adjacent new townsite of Mallett, and a new  bridge was installed across a back channel.

The Carbonate ferry across the main channel was subsidized 1912–1915 and 1929–1931. During the unsubsidized intermediary period, dependable rowboats operated. When high water flooded the valley bottom, rowing upstream for a mile was essential to reach vehicles parked by the highway. In winter, traffic crossed upon the ice.

The McMurdo post office operated 1904–1953. The Old Riverboat Hotel at the landing was the home of Capt. Edwards 1927–38. Although the hotel burned down decades ago, the brick chimneys remain.

Created in 2014 and immediately south is the world's largest wooden paddle. Guinness World Records has certified the  curiosity resting on the hillside to the east of the highway.

Maps

Footnotes

References

Unincorporated settlements in British Columbia